Adventures of Pip is a side-scrolling platform game developed and published by Tic Toc Games. The game launched in June 2015 for Microsoft Windows, OS X, and Wii U and in July 2015 for iOS. Xbox One and PlayStation 4 versions were released in August 2015, and the Nintendo Switch version in September 2020.

Gameplay 
In Adventures of Pip, the player plays as Pip, a single pixel born into a world of hi-res and lo-res characters. As Pip defeats his enemies, he gains the ability to evolve into an 8-bit hero and later a 16-bit hero. Each evolution has its advantages and disadvantages. Pip must switch between his evolutions to complete levels. Players will need to evolve and devolve, wall jump, run, shove, break blocks, float, collect, and fight their way through bosses and henchmen till they get to the Evil Queen DeRezia.

Plot 
An evil witch has come and turned the King and Queen into pixels and kidnapped Princess Adeline. It is up to Pip to venture forth and navigate the strange landscapes to rescue the damsel in distress from the clutches of Queen DeRezzia.

Reception

The iOS and Wii U versions received "generally favorable reviews", while the PC, PlayStation 4, Xbox One and Switch versions received above-average reviews, according to the review aggregation website Metacritic.

Dermot Creegan of Hardcore Gamer called the Wii U version "a delightful little platformer full of charm, challenge and impeccable level design." Andrew Fitch of EGMNow said of the same Wii U version, "Tic Toc Games' impressive pedigree at WayForward is on full display in Adventures of Pip—one of the only problems is that it's not quite as feature-rich as you'd like."

References

External links
 Adventures of Pip at Tic Toc Games
 

2015 video games
Indie video games
IOS games
Kickstarter-funded video games
Nintendo Switch games
MacOS games
PlayStation 4 games
Side-scrolling platform games
Video games scored by Jake Kaufman
Video games developed in the United States
Windows games
Wii U games
Wii U eShop games
Xbox One games